Burchard (Bouchard, Burckhart, Burkhart, Burkard, Burkhard, Burkert, Borchardt, Burckhardt and variants, Old English Burgheard) are both Germanic given names and surnames, from Burg "castle" and hart "hard". Notable people with the name include:

Given name
Burchard
 Burchard of Würzburg, an 8th-century Anglo-Saxon missionary to the Frankish Empire
 Burchard I, Duke of Swabia (c. 855/860–911)
 Burchard II, Duke of Swabia (c. 883–926)
 Burchard III, Duke of Swabia (c. 915–973)
 Burchard, Duke of Thuringia (died 908)
 Burchard of Worms (c. 950–1025), theologian
 Burchard (archbishop of Vienne) (died 1031)
 Burchard (bishop of Aosta) (died 1068), also Archbishop of Lyon (1033–1034), under the name Burchard III
 Burchard II, Bishop of Halberstadt, 11th-century German cleric and statesman
 Burchard of Basle, 11th-century bishop of Basle
 Burchard of Istria (died 1106/1107)
 Burchard, Bishop of Utrecht, 11th/12th century
 Burchard ( 1150–1195), second abbot of St. John's Abbey in the Thurtal, see Berchtold of Engelberg
 Burchard of Mount Sion, 13th-century traveler to the Middle East

Burghard
 Burghard Freiherr von Schorlemer-Alst (1825–1895), Prussian parliamentarian

Burkhard
 Burkhard Gladigow (born 1939), German scholar of religious studies and classical philology

Burkard
 Burkard Polster (born 1965), mathematician

Surname
Borchard
Adolphe Borchard (1882–1967), French pianist and composer
August Borchard (1864–1940), German physician and surgeon
Beatrix Borchard (1950), German musicologist and author
Edwin Borchard (1884–1951), international legal scholar and jurist
Ian Borchard (1957), former Australian rules footballer
Joe Borchard (1978),  American former Major League Baseball (MLB) outfielder
Leo Borchard (1899–1945), German-Russian conductor
Ruth Borchard (1910–2000), British writer

Borchardt

Borchert
 Bernhard Borchert (1863–1945), Baltic German artist in Latvia
 Jochen Borchert (born 1940), German politician
 John R. Borchert, proponent of Borchert's Epochs
 Katrin Borchert (born 1969), German Australian kayaker
 William G. Borchert, American screenwriter
 Wolfgang Borchert (1921–1947), German author

Bouchard

Bourquard
 Claude Bourquard (1937–2011), French fencer

Burchard
 Burchard-Bélaváry family, an aristocratic family of Hungarian origin, originally called Both de Szikava et Bélavár
 Brendon Burchard (born 1977), American author and motivational speaker
 Ernst Burchard (1876–1920), German author and doctor
 Charles Burchard (1810–1879), American politician from Wisconsin
 Horatio C. Burchard (1825–1908), American politician from Illinois
 Johann Burchard, 15th-century church figure
 Johann Burchard Freystein (1671–1718), German lawyer and hymn writer
 Johann Heinrich Burchard (1852–1912), Hamburg lawyer and politician
 Oscar Burchard (1863–1949), German botanist, see List of Euphorbia species (G-O)
 Peter Burchard, author
 Petrea Burchard (born 1955), American actress
 Samuel D. Burchard (politician) (1836–1901), American politician from Wisconsin
 Pablo Burchard (1879–1964), Chilean painter
 Wolf Burchard (*1985), British-German art historian and museum curator

Burchardt
 Brigitte Burchardt (born 1954), German chess player
 Regina Burchardt (born 1983), German volleyball player
 Ulla Burchardt (born 1954), German politician

Burckhardt
 Burckhardt, or (de) Bourcard, a family of the Basel patriciate
 Johann Ludwig Burckhardt (1784–1817), Swiss traveler and orientalist
 Jacob Burckhardt (1818–1897), Swiss historian of art and culture
 Gottlieb Burckhardt (1836–1907), Swiss psychiatrist
 Carl Jacob Burckhardt (1891–1974), Swiss diplomat and historian
 Titus Burckhardt (1908–1984), Swiss author and traditionalist
 Rudy Burckhardt (1914–1999), Swiss-American filmmaker and photographer
 Carl Nathanael Burckhardt (1878–1923), Swiss painter and sculptor
 Fabian Burckhardt, Swiss curler
 Johann Jakob Burckhardt (1903–2006), Swiss mathematician and crystallographer
 Johann Karl Burckhardt (1773–1825), German astronomer and mathematician
 Karl Burckhardt-Iselin (1830–1893), Swiss politician
 Martha Burkhardt (1874–1956), Swiss painter
 Max Burckhard (1854–1912), Austrian theatre director
 Walter Burckhardt (1905–1971), Swiss dermatologist

Burgard
 Wolfram Burgard (born 1961), German roboticist

Burgert
 Jonas Burgert, German artist

Burghardt
 Arthur Burghardt (born 1947), American actor
 Jack Burghardt (1929–2002), Canadian news broadcaster and politician
 Marcus Burghardt (born 1983), German cyclist

Burkard
 Chris Burkard (born 1986), American photographer
 Oscar Burkard (1877–1950), German-American soldier
 Rainer Burkard (born 1943), Austrian mathematician
 Stephen F. Burkard (born 1897), New York state senator

Burkart
 Arturo Burkart (1906–1975), Argentine botanist, see Prosopis
 Stefan Burkart (born 1957), Swiss Olympic sprinter

Burkhard
 Paul Burkhard (1911–1977), Swiss composer
 Willy Burkhard (1900–1955), Swiss composer

Burkhardt
 Heinrich Friedrich Karl Ludwig Burkhardt (1861–1914), German mathematician
 Filip Burkhardt (born 1987), Polish footballer
 Marcin Burkhardt (born 1983), Polish footballer
 Nick Burkhardt, fictional Grimm character

Burkhart
 Jackie Burkhart, fictional That '70s Show character
 Morgan Burkhart (born 1972), American baseball player

Burkert

 Herbert Burkert, German law scholar
 Martin Burkert (born 1964), German politician
 Nancy Ekholm Burkert (born 1933), American artist and illustrator
 Rudolf Burkert (1904–1985), German/Czechoslovakian Nordic skier
 Walter Burkert (1931–2015), German classicist

See also
 Burgheard

Surnames from given names
German-language surnames